Sexy Cora (born Carolin Ebert, civil name Carolin Wosnitza; 2 May 1987 – 20 January 2011) was a German pornographic actress, model, singer, exotic dancer, wife of Tim Wosnitza, and reality show participant.

Cora was born in Berlin. She was one of the participants of the 10th season of Big Brother Germany. Cora released two music singles after her Big Brother participation: "My Love – La, La, La" and "Lass uns kicken (Alles klar wunderbar)".

Medical issues and death 

Cora was hospitalized in 2009 after trying to break the world record for the number of fellatios performed in one day. She was trying for 200 men but was unable to pass 75.

Cora suffered a heart attack on 11 January 2011, during her breast enlargement surgery at a plastic surgery clinic in Hamburg. It was her sixth such operation. Minutes into the procedure, she went into cardiac arrest, causing her blood pressure to steadily drop and her organs to stop functioning. She sustained heavy brain damage as a result. She was moved to a local hospital and placed in a medically induced coma for a week due to her condition. Her husband, Tim Wosnitza, claimed that he was told by doctors that she would die due to the trauma to her breasts, and was at her side for nine days until she died on 20 January 2011.

Police investigated the clinic for possible treatment errors. On 21 January, the two doctors who performed the surgery on Cora were charged with negligent manslaughter. A statement from the clinic said the doctors were "extremely upset and deeply regret the death of patient C.W." and that they are giving "full and complete support" to authorities investigating her death.

Cora was buried in a pink coffin at Hamburg's Ohlsdorf Cemetery on 2 February 2011. In May 2011, however, cemetery officials demanded that her husband remove a four-feet tall marble angel and memorial photos that marked the grave, claiming the $15,000 installation was "too sexy". They argued that the grave's markings were inappropriate and could be deemed "offensive by other mourners visiting the cemetery," one of the largest in the world.

On 5 February 2013, the Deutsche Presse-Agentur reported that a 56-year-old anesthetist had been convicted of involuntary manslaughter in the death of Cora. The Hamburg hospital doctor was given a 15-month suspended sentence for not ensuring that the actress had enough oxygen during the 2011 cosmetic surgery.

Filmography 
2009: Versaute Freizeit
2010: Be Famous
2011: Gegengerade – Niemand siegt am Millerntor!

Awards 

2010: Venus Award: Best Amateur Actress Germany
2010: Venus Award: Best Toy Series International (Sexy Cora Toys / Orion)
2010: Erotixxx Award: Best Amateur Actress

Music singles 
2010: "My Love – La, La, La"
2010: "Lass uns kicken (Alles klar wunderbar)"

References

External links 

1987 births
2011 deaths
21st-century German actresses
Big Brother (franchise) contestants
German pornographic film actresses
Actresses from Berlin
Big Brother (German TV series)
20th-century German musicians
Burials at the Ohlsdorf Cemetery
20th-century German women singers